Mustafa Yumlu (born 25 September 1987) is a Turkish professional footballer who currently plays as a center back for BB Erzurumspor in the TFF First League.

Life and career
Yumlu began his footballing career as an eleven-year-old in Aydinlispor's youth team. He was transferred to Trabzonspor the following year, where he played in their youth teams until 2003. He joined another local club, Idmanocağı, and competed with them for three years before joining Arsinspor in 2006. Yumlu was loaned out immediately to 1461 Trabzon, where he competed in 29 matches, scoring one goal. He returned to Arsinspor the following season, featuring in 34 matches while scoring four goals. Trabzonspor transferred him for the second time in 2008, but he was immediately loaned out to 1461 Trabzon for the second time as well. Yumlu spent two years on loan at 1461 Trabzon before joining up with the Trabzonspor senior squad at the start of 2010–11 season. He competed in six friendlies, scoring one goal.

On 10 May 2018, Yumlu helped Akhisar Belediyespor win their first professional trophy, the 2017–18 Turkish Cup.

Honours
Akhisarspor
 Turkish Cup (1): 2017-18
 Turkish Super Cup: 2018

References

External links
Mustafa Yumlu at Trabzonspor.org.tr  
 

1987 births
Turkish footballers
Turkey B international footballers
Trabzonspor footballers
Eskişehirspor footballers
Akhisarspor footballers
Denizlispor footballers
Büyükşehir Belediye Erzurumspor footballers
Sportspeople from Trabzon
Living people
Association football central defenders
Association football defenders